Augustus Schoonmaker Jr. (March 2, 1828 – April 9, 1894) was an American lawyer and Democratic politician.

Life
Schoonmaker was born March 2, 1828, in the Town of Rochester in Ulster County to Hendricus Martin (1792-1870) and Jane (nee Schoonmaker) Schoonmaker (1796-1866). His parents were second cousins, sharing the same great-grandparents, Jan and Margaret Hornbeck Schoonmaker.

Schoonmaker was originally a teacher and superintendent of schools in Ulster County. In 1853, he was admitted to the bar. He was County Judge in Ulster County from 1864 to 1872, and a member of the New York State Senate (14th D.) in 1876 and 1877.

He was New York Attorney General from 1878 to 1879, elected at the New York state election, 1877 on the Democratic ticket. At the New York state election, 1879, he was defeated for re-election by Republican Hamilton Ward Sr. At the New York state election, 1881, he ran for the New York Court of Appeals but was defeated by Republican Francis M. Finch.

Afterwards he served on the New York Board of Civil Service Commissioners (1883–1887) and was an original appointee of President Grover Cleveland to the Interstate Commerce Commission, serving from 1887 to 1890.

Schoonmaker died of tonsillitis on April 9, 1894, in Kingston.

He married Louise Cooper (1835-1910) and they are both buried in Wiltwyck Cemetery in Kingston.

External links
Augustus Schoonmaker, obituary in The New York Times, April 11, 1894

1828 births
1894 deaths
American people of Dutch descent
People from Ulster County, New York
New York State Attorneys General
New York (state) state senators
New York (state) state court judges
People of the Interstate Commerce Commission
Infectious disease deaths in New York (state)
19th-century American politicians
19th-century American judges